The Calabar International Convention Centre it's found located in Calabar, Cross River, Nigeria. It opened in the third quarter of 2015.

About Calabar International Convention Centre 

Calabar International Convention Centre (CICC) consists of four adjoining sculptural volumes called blocks. The building is situated on top of a hill and has tropical panoramic views of the Calabar River from all the foyers.
The design and overall aesthetic of the CICC was the work of the Danish architects, Henning Larsen Architects.

Calabar ICC is the vision of the former Governor of Cross River State , Senator Liyel Imoke. The Centre will run as a partnership between the Cross River State Government and Alliance Venue and Facility Management.

Venues 

The flexible building design allows for several types of events to take place at the same time. The CICC will be able to accommodate up to 5,000 delegates in 21 different venues, with as many as 2,000 for plenary sessions and as little as 10 in a small meeting room. Also, there are dedicated offices for event organizers and VIP rooms in most blocks. All halls are designed with acoustic walls, to reduce sound travel around the building to the barest minimum.

Events with exhibition component can be comfortably hosted at the CICC as there is exhibition space in conference halls and foyers. There is also additional per-allocated space for temporary exhibition marquee up to 5,000 sqm, directly connected to the Main Hall and the other conference halls.

Management 
On 28 August 2014, CICC welcomed a new management company, Alliance Venue and Facilities Management Pty (AVFM). In November 2014, Paul D'Arcy, meetings industry acclaimed 'Centre-opener', was appointed CEO of the CICC,. Other appointments into the management team included MICE marketing expert, Ben Asoro as Commercial Director and Adele Eloff as Director of Operations.

Quick Facts 

It is located 11 km north of Calabar at the Calabar River. Part of the 367 ha Summit Hills development (CICC, 18-hole golf course, business hotel, specialist hospital, residential villas)

It is located from Calabar International Airport: 18 km (30 minutes drive)

The Architects were: Henning Larsen Architects, Copenhagen, Denmark

It has a total floor space of 35 000sqm.

With a total number of conference rooms:  21 Conference Rooms which consists of 5 conference halls (220-2,000 delegates),12 meeting rooms (55-90 delegates), 3 meeting suites (10-25 delegates) and 1 VIP room

 Lounges and foyers: 3 Venues
 Largest room: Main Hall with 2,000 seats
 Total capacity of the centre: Approximately 5,000 delegates
 Largest banqueting spaces: Main Hall (900 dinner guests) – Hall B ; Hall A (650 dinner guests) Hall C (500 dinner guests)
 Main kitchen: 1,200sqm, largest in Nigeria and 4 distribution kitchens
 Exhibition space: In conference halls and foyers. Additional pre-allocated space for temporary exhibition marquee up to 5,000sqm at the back of the CICC, directly connected to the Main Hall and the other conference halls
 Coffee shop: In entrance hall, 40 seats
 Parking: Secure parking for 700 vehicles

Transport
The convention centre is connected to the Tinapa Business and Leisure Resort by a  monorail, built by Intamin, which opened in 2016. In 2017, it was reported the system was working but was not carrying any passengers.

References

External links

Event venues in Nigeria